Warrant Officer of the Navy (WO-N) is the most senior sailor in the Royal Australian Navy (RAN). It is a singular appointment, being only held by one person at any time. The special insignia for the WO-N is the Australian coat of arms with a wreath around it. The current Warrant Officer of the Navy is Andrew Bertoncin.

The appointment is the equivalent of the Regimental Sergeant Major of the Army (RSM-A) in the Australian Army, and Warrant Officer of the Air Force (WOFF-AF) in the Royal Australian Air Force.

Appointees

References

External links
 Warrant Officer of the Navy

Royal Australian Navy
Military appointments of Australia